Izel-lès-Hameau (before June 2009: Izel-les-Hameaux) is a commune in the Pas-de-Calais department in the Hauts-de-France region of France.

Geography

History
The location was known as Le Hameau. It was commemorated with a ceremony and plaque in 2015.

Population

Places of interest
 The church of St. Pierre, rebuilt in 1962.

See also
Communes of the Pas-de-Calais department

References

Izelleshameau